Joe Wenderoth (born 1966) is an American writer, performer, teacher, and film-maker.  He has published six books: four books of poetry, an epistolary novel, and a book of essays.  Wenderoth curates "The Seizure State", which appears in the Brooklyn-based magazine Gigantic.  He also produces About Brett Favre, which is the podcast associated with "The Seizure State".

Wenderoth's work is widely anthologized, and has been published in collections and periodicals such as Harper's, The Nation, The Anchor Book of New American Short Stories, Best American Poetry 2007, Best American Essays 2008, Poetry 180, The Next American Essay, The Best American Prose Poems: From Poe To Present, The Body Electric, The New American Poets: A Bread Loaf Anthology, and American Poetry: Next Generation.

In 2003, the One Yellow Rabbit theater company performed an adaptation of Wenderoth's Letters To Wendy's. The adaptation was done by Bruce McCulloch (of The Kids in the Hall) and Blake Brooker, both of whom also starred in the production.

In 2007, Wenderoth performed in collaboration with Gibby Haynes (of the Butthole Surfers) in Brooklyn at the Issue Project Room.

Wenderoth is a full professor in the graduate Creative Writing Program at the University of California at Davis.

Originally from Baltimore, Maryland, Weneroth received his M.F.A. from Warren Wilson College.

Bibliography

 Letters to Wendy's (Verse Press, 2000), epistolary novel

Poetry
 If I Don't Breathe How Do I Sleep (Wave Books, 2014)
 No Real Light (Wave Books, 2007)
 It Is If I Speak (Wesleyan University Press, 2000)
 The Endearment (Short Line Editions, 1999)
 Disfortune (Wesleyan University Press, 1995)

Essays
 The Holy Spirit of Life: Essays Written for John Ashcroft's Secret Self (Wave Books, 2005)

References

External links
 Wenderoth's Youtube channel
 Audio files of Wenderoth at archive.org

American male poets
American academics of English literature
Writers from Baltimore
Poets from Maryland
Warren Wilson College alumni
Living people
1966 births
University of California, Davis faculty
American male non-fiction writers
21st-century American poets
21st-century American male writers